Articles (arranged alphabetically) related to Macau include:

0-9
June 24
December 20

A
Age of Discovery
Aircraft hijacking
Air Koryo
Air Macau
Ponte de Amizade
List of assassinated people
Assembleia Municipal das Ilhas
Assembleia Municipal de Macau
Associação dos Radioamadores de Macau
Aureo Castro Nunes e Castro

B
Baiyue
Macao Basic Law
Carlos Felipe Ximenes Belo
Dines Bjørner

C
Cantonese
Cantonese opera
Canidrome (Macau)
Card game
Casino Lisboa, Macau
Cathedral Parish (Freguesia da Sé)
Catholic religious institutions, associations, and communities in Macau
Chief Executive
Chief Executive of Macau
China
List of China administrative regions by population density
China proper
Chinese character
Chinese Domain Name Consortium
Chinese language
Chinese Peruvian
Chinese spoken language
China Travel Service Building, Macau
Chinese white dolphin
Church of the United Brethren in Christ
City-state
List of national coats of arms
List of colonial governors in 1706
List of colonial governors in 1758
Commission Against Corruption
Communications in Macau
Concelho
Constitution of the People's Republic of China
Cotai
Cotai Strip
List of countries by continent
List of country calling codes
Rua do Cunha
Kristang language (Cristão)
Kristang people (Cristão)
Culture of Macau

D
Fernao Pires de Andrade
Demographics of Macau
Dragon boat race
Driving on the left or right

E
East Asia
Economy of Macau
Education in Macau
Elections in Macau
EVA Air

F
Jose dos Santos Ferreira
List of films set in Macau
Flag of Macau
List of flags by number of colors
Free port
Freguesia (Macau)
Functional constituency

G
Gambling in Macau
Geography of Macau
Ponte Governador Nobre de Carvalho
Governor of Macau
Macau Grand Prix
Greyhound racing
Guangdong

H
Hac Sa Beach
Hippodromo
History of China
History of Hong Kong
History of Macau
History of Portugal
Edmund Ho
Stanley Ho
Homosexuality in China
Hong Kong
Hong Kong International Airport
Hong Kong-Zhuhai-Macau Bridge
Hopewell Highway Infrastructure Ltd

I
Lists of incumbents
ISO 3166-1:MO
ISO 3166-2:MO
Immigration to Macau

J
Jean-François de Galaup, comte de La Pérouse

K
Kwang-Chou-Wan
Kirwitzer, Wenzeslas Pantaleon

L
Leon Lai
Land borders
Languages of China
Legal age to purchase alcoholic beverages
Liang Fa
Library of Congress Country Studies
List of bridges and tunnels in Macau
Lu Muzhen

M
.mo
Macanese (disambiguation)
Macanese cuisine
Macanese language
Macanese people
Macau
Macao (1952 film)
Macao Daily News
Macau (game)
Macau International Airport
Macau Jockey Club
Macau Peninsula
Macau Tower
Mainland China
Matsu (goddess)
MGM Grand Macau
Military of Macau
List of mobile country codes
Monetary Authority of Macau
List of movies set in Hong Kong
Municipalities of Macau
 Municipality of Macau
 Municipality of the Islands
Music of Macau

N
Gallery of national flags
Northern Asia-Pacific Division of Seventh-day Adventists
Freguesia de Nossa Senhora de Fátima
Freguesia de Nossa Senhora do Carmo
Chinese numerals
Nanhaipotamon

O
List of official languages
Our Lady of Fatima
Our Lady of Fatima Parish, Macau
Our Lady Carmo Parish

P
Pacific Century Cyberworks
List of cities and parishes in Macau
Harry Smith Parkes
Pataca
People's Republic of China
Administrative divisions of the People's Republic of China
Political divisions of Portugal
Lists of political parties
List of political parties in Macau
Politics of Macau
Portas do Cerco
Portugal
Portuguese Creole
Portuguese language
Province of China
Public Security Police Force of Macau
Puxi
Pyongyang

Q

R
Michelle Reis
Republic of China
Rotary International
Ruins of St. Paul

S
Sacra Congregatio de Propaganda Fide
Ponte de Sai Van
St. Anthony Parish (Freguesia de Santo Antonio)
St. Francisco Xavier Parish (Freguesia de São Francisco Xavier)
St. Lawrence Parish (Freguesia de São Lourenco)
St. Lazarus Parish (Freguesia de São Lazaro)
Cathedral of Saint Paul
António de Oliveira Salazar
Sands Macau
Takuma Sato
Freguesia da Sé
Sebastian I of Portugal
Macau Security Force
Severe acute respiratory syndrome
Shangchuan Island
Sheng Kung Hui
SmarTone
Society of Jesus
Soler
South China Sea
State Council of the People's Republic of China
List of state leaders in 2002
List of state leaders in 2003
List of state leaders in 2004
Sub-replacement fertility
Sun Yat-sen
Sun Yat Sen Memorial House

T
Taipa
Dom Justo Takayama
Tiago Monteiro
Timeline of Chinese history
Time zone
Tourism
Tourism in Macau
Traditional Chinese characters
Transmac (Transportes Urbanos de Macau SARL)
TCM (Transportas Companhia de Macau)
Transport in Hong Kong
Treaty of Tordesillas
Triad (organized crime)
Lists of tropical cyclone names
TurboJET
Twins (musical group)

U
Unequal Treaties
Union for Development
List of universities and colleges in Macau
University of Macau
UNU-IIST (United Nations University / International Institute for Software Technology)

V
Va Kio Daily
Vasco Joaquim Rocha Vieira
The Venetian Macao

W
Gordon Wu
Wynn Macau

X
Xinhua News Agency

Y

Z

See also

List of China-related topics
List of Taiwan-related topics
Lists of country-related topics

Macau